Fondant icing, also commonly referred to simply as fondant (from the  ), is an icing used to decorate or sculpt cakes and pastries. It is made from sugar, water, gelatin, vegetable fat or shortening, and glycerol. It does not have the texture of most icings; rolled fondant is akin to stiff clay, while poured fondant is a thick liquid. The word, in French, means 'melting,' coming from the same root as fondue and foundry.

Types of rolled fondant
Rolled fondant, fondant icing, or pettinice, which is not the same material as poured fondant, is commonly used to decorate wedding cakes. Although wedding cakes are traditionally made with marzipan and royal icing, fondant is increasingly common due to nut allergies, as it does not require almond meal. Rolled fondant includes gelatin (or agar in vegetarian recipes) and food-grade glycerine, which keeps the sugar pliable and creates a dough-like consistency.  Rolled fondant is rolled out like a pie crust and used to cover the cake.

Commercial shelf-stable rolled fondant often consists principally of sugar and hydrogenated oil.  However, different formulations for commercial shelf-stable fondant are available and include other ingredients, such as sugar, cellulose gum, and water.

Marshmallow fondant is a form of rolled fondant often made and used by home bakers and hobbyists. Marshmallow fondant is made by combining melted shelf-stable marshmallows, water, powdered sugar, and solid vegetable shortening. Home bakers use this recipe for homemade fondant due to the readily available access to required ingredients.

Sculpting fondant is similar to rolled fondant but with a stiffer consistency, which makes it a good sculpting material.

Sugar paste or gum paste is similar to rolled fondant, but hardens completely—and therefore is used for bigger cake decorations, such as bride and groom figures, bigger flowers, etc. Sugar paste is made mainly of egg whites, powdered sugar, and shortening.  Tylose can be added to make gum paste more pliable for detailed work.

Physical chemistry of poured fondant 

Poured fondant is formed by supersaturating water with sucrose. More than twice as much sugar dissolves in water at the boiling point than at room temperature. After the sucrose dissolves, if the solution is left to cool undisturbed, the sugar remains dissolved in a supersaturated solution until nucleation occurs. While the solution is supersaturated, if a cook puts a seed crystal (undissolved sucrose) into the mix, or agitates the solution, the dissolved sucrose crystallizes to form large, crunchy crystals (which is how rock candy is made). However, if the cook lets the solution cool undisturbed and then stirs it vigorously, it forms many tiny crystals, resulting in a smooth-textured fondant.

Gallery

See also

 Ganache
 Royal icing

References

Food paste
Sugar confectionery
Cake decorating